In mathematics, more specifically in algebra, the adjective étale refers to several closely related concepts:
 Étale morphism
 Formally étale morphism
 Étale cohomology
 Étale topology
 Étale fundamental group
 Étale group scheme
 Étale algebra

Other
 Étale (mountain) in Savoie and Haute-Savoie, France

See also
 Étalé space
 Etail, or online commerce